Gettysburg is an unincorporated community in Preble County, in the U.S. state of Ohio. The National Trail Local School K-12 complex is located on U.S. Route 40 in Gettysburg.

History
Gettysburg was laid out in 1832 when the National Road was extended to that point. The community was named after Gettysburg, in Pennsylvania, the native state of a first settler. A post office called Gettysburg was established in 1837, and remained in operation until 1858.

References

Unincorporated communities in Preble County, Ohio
Unincorporated communities in Ohio